Messaoud Zeghar Stadium is a multi-use stadium in El Eulma, Algeria.  It is currently used mostly for football matches and is the home ground of MC El Eulma of the Algerian Championnat National.  The stadium holds 25,000 spectators.

External links
Venue information - goalzz.com

Messaoud Zougar
Buildings and structures in Sétif Province